James White (born February 8, 1934), known professionally as Jim Mundy, is an American country music singer. Between 1973 and 1976, he recorded for ABC Records and charted within the Top 40 of the Hot Country Songs charts.

Mundy also recorded commercial jingles for Pillsbury, Union 76, Coca-Cola and Miller Brewing Company.

Two of his songs, "The River's Too Wide" and "Come Home", received awards from the American Society of Composers, Authors and Publishers in 1974.

Mundy's sister, Ann J. Morton, and brother, Bill White, were also country music singers.

Singles

References

1934 births
Living people
People from Muldrow, Oklahoma
American country singer-songwriters
Hickory Records artists
ABC Records artists
Singer-songwriters from Oklahoma
Country musicians from Oklahoma